Johann Georg Lickl, also Ligkl, Hans-Georg Lickl,  (11 April 1769 – 12 May 1843) was an Austrian composer, organist, Kapellmeister in the main church of Pécs, and piano teacher.

Lickl was born in Korneuburg, Lower Austria, and orphaned as a child. He studied under Witzig, who was the organist at the church of Korneuburg.

He relocated to Vienna in 1785 and studied under Albrechtsberger and Joseph Haydn. Later in the 1780s, he became organist at the Carmelite church in Leopoldstadt. He collaborated with Emanuel Schikaneder on a number of Singspiele in the 1790s, working in the Theater auf der Wieden.  He died, aged 74, in Fünfkirchen, southern Royal Hungary, Imperial Austria.

He wrote operas, one wind quintet, three string quartets, and served as a Kapellmeister at several churches. From 1807 until his death he was choirmaster at what is now Pécs.

A large portion of his output is sacred music, including masses and requiems.

His sons, Karl Georg Lickl (1801, Vienna – 1877, Vienna) and Ägid(ius Ferdinand) Karl Lickl (1803, Vienna – 1864, Trieste), were also composers, whose output includes works for piano and for physharmonica, including a transcription of Beethoven's Mass in C major for physharmonica and piano.

See also 
 Music of Pécs
 Roman Catholic Diocese of Pécs

References

External links 
 

1769 births
1843 deaths
19th-century Austrian people
18th-century Austrian people
Austrian Romantic composers
Austrian opera composers
Male opera composers
Classical composers of church music
Austrian classical organists
Male classical organists
Austrian Roman Catholics
Austrian music educators
Hungarian people of Austrian descent
People from Korneuburg
People from Leopoldstadt
People from Wieden
People from Pécs
19th-century classical composers
Austrian male classical composers
19th-century Hungarian people
19th-century male musicians